The president of the Chamber of Representatives is the presiding officer of the lower house of the Federal Parliament of Belgium. The current president of the Chamber of Representatives is Eliane Tillieux of the Socialist Party.

The longest-serving president is Frans Van Cauwelaert.

See also
Belgian Chamber of Representatives
List of presidents of the Belgian Senate
Politics of Belgium

Sources

External links
Official Website of the Belgian Chamber of Representatives

Presidents
Belgian Chamber of Representatives